In biochemistry, phenylmethylsulfonyl fluoride (PMSF) is a serine protease inhibitor (serine hydrolase inactivator) commonly used in the preparation of cell lysates. PMSF does not inactivate all serine proteases.  The effective concentration of PMSF is between 0.1 - 1 mM. The half-life is short in aqueous solutions (110 min at pH 7, 55 min at pH 7.5, and 35 min at pH 8, all at 25 °C). Stock solutions are usually made up in anhydrous ethanol, isopropanol, or corn oil and diluted immediately before use.

PMSF binds specifically to the active site serine residue in serine hydrolases. It does not bind to any other serine residues in the protein. This is a result of the hyperactivity of that serine residue caused by the specific environmental conditions in the enzyme's active site (catalytic triad). Because PMSF binds covalently to the enzyme, the complex can be viewed by X-ray crystallography; it can therefore be used as a chemical label to identify an essential active site serine in an enzyme.

Enzyme(active)Ser-O-H + F-SO2CH2C6H5 → EnzymeSer-O-SO2CH2C6H5 + HF

Serine protease +  PMSF  → Irreversible enzyme-PMS complex + HF

The median lethal dose between 150–215 mg/kg (acetylcholine esterase inactivator). PMSF should be handled only inside a fume hood and while wearing gloves. DMSO is sometimes recommended as solvent for stock solutions, but should not be used as it makes intact skin permeable for PMSF.

See also

 AEBSF

References

External links
 The MEROPS online database for peptidases and their inhibitors: PMSF

Protease inhibitors
Serine protease inhibitors
Sulfonyl halides